A Difficult Parish (Swedish: Ett svarskott pastorat) is a 1958 Swedish comedy film directed by Emil A. Lingheim and Åke Ohlmarks and featuring Knut Borglin, Hans Alfredson and Åke Ohlmarks. The cast included many non-professional actors. The film's sets were designed by the art director Arne Åkermark. Location shooting took place around Lund and Sjöbo in Scania.It is an adaptation of the 1895 short story of the same name by Axel Wallengren.

Cast
 Knut Borglin as 	Calle Kula
 Hans Alfredson as 	Redaktör
 Erik Broman as Ägir Trulsson - dräng
 Sten Broman as 	Fridolf Fernelius - konsistorienotarie
 Maria Crona as Eurentia Glasberg - postfröken
 Gunnar Eneskär as 	Efraim Johansson - pastorsadjunkt
 Leif Ernhagen as Ebenezer Nilsson
 Crüll Fältström as Balder Hjönsson - dräng 	
 Mac Gustafsson as 	Asatorparen
 Hugo Hagander as 	Petter Lantz - korpral 
 Daniel Hjort as 	Mormon-Mats / Höder	
 Karl-Edvard Jeppsson as 	Andreas - kyrkoherde 
 Bengt-Olof Landin as 	Länsman
 Clas Larsson as 	Goda Olsson
 Axel Liffner as 	Lundblom - redaktionssekreterare
 Folke Lind as 	Spuling
 Kim Meurling as 	Mattsson - kyrkvärd
 Börje Norrman as 	Sämund Holm - stins
 Åke Ohlmarks as 'Professorskan' - Calle Kulas hushållerska
 Anna Christina Ulfsparre as Pernilla - piga

References

Bibliography 
 Qvist, Per Olov & von Bagh, Peter. Guide to the Cinema of Sweden and Finland. Greenwood Publishing Group, 2000.

External links 
 

1958 films
Swedish comedy films
1958 comedy films
1950s Swedish-language films
Films directed by Emil A. Lingheim
1950s Swedish films